Landeck is an unincorporated community in Allen County, in the U.S. state of Ohio.

History
Landeck was built up around a Catholic church founded in the 1860s. A post office called Landeck was established in 1871, and remained in operation until 1907.

References

Unincorporated communities in Allen County, Ohio
1860s establishments in Ohio
Unincorporated communities in Ohio